The Croatian Olympic Committee ( (HOO)) is the non-profit organization representing Croatian athletes in the International Olympic Committee. The COC organizes Croatia's representatives at the Summer and Winter Olympic Games. It also organizes the Croatian contingent at smaller events such as the Mediterranean Games.

Members of the committee are 44 sports federations, which elect the Executive Council composed of the president and 15 members.

In 2006, the COC organized the first Croatian World Games in Zadar. These games gather various groups of diaspora Croats against contingents from Croatia and Bosnia and Herzegovina.

History
The Croatian Olympic Committee was founded on 10 September 1991 in Zagreb. IOC was temporally recognised Committee on 17 January 1992, which was entered way to Croatian athletes in the international olympic family.  They are participate first time in Winter Olympics in Albertville and Summer Olympic Games in Barcelona. Full recognised by the IOC was on 24 September 1993.

Presidents

Croatians in the International Olympic Committee

Executive committee
The 2020–2024 committee of HOO is consisted of:
 President: Zlatko Mateša
 Member of IOC in Croatia: Kolinda Grabar-Kitarović
 Vice Presidents: Blanka Vlašić, Željko Jerkov, Sanda Čorak, and Morana Paliković Gruden 
 Members: Ante Baković, Branimir Bašić, Miho Glavić, Damir Knjaz, Željan Konsuo, Boris Mesarić, Ivo-Goran Munivrana, Dragan Primorac, Zlatko Taritaš, Ivan Veštić, Marijan Kustić, Vladislav Veselica, Nikolina Babić, Srećko Ferenčak, Zrinko Gregurek, Zvjezdana Tuma Pavlov, and Mario Meštrović

Member federations
The Croatian National Federations are the organizations that coordinate all aspects of their individual sports. They are responsible for training, competition and development of their sports. There are currently 37 Olympic Summer and 7 Winter Sport Federations in Croatia.

See also
Croatia at the Olympics

References

External links
 Official website 

National Olympic Committees
 
!
Sports organizations established in 1991
1991 establishments in Croatia